California's 59th State Assembly district is one of 80 California State Assembly districts. It is currently represented by Democrat Reggie Jones-Sawyer of Los Angeles.

District profile 
The district encompasses most of South Los Angeles, centered along Interstate 110. The district is primarily urban and heavily Latino.

Los Angeles County – 4.7%
 Florence-Graham
 Huntington Park – 11.9%
 Los Angeles – 9.8%
 Exposition Park – partial
 Florence
 Historic South Central
 University Park
 Vermont Square – partial
 Vermont-Slauson
 Walnut Park

Election results from statewide races

List of Assembly Members 
Due to redistricting, the 59th district has been moved around different parts of the state. The current iteration resulted from the 2011 redistricting by the California Citizens Redistricting Commission.

Election results 1992 - present

2020

2018

2016

2014

2012

2010

2008

2006

2004

2002

2000

1998

1996

1994

1992

See also 
 California State Assembly
 California State Assembly districts
 Districts in California

References

External links 
 District map — from the California Citizens Redistricting Commission.

59
Government of Los Angeles County, California
Government of Los Angeles
South Los Angeles
Exposition Park (Los Angeles neighborhood)
Huntington Park, California
University Park, Los Angeles